Mertl is a Czech surname.

Notable people with this surname include:
 Gregory Mertl (born 1969), composer
 Jan Mertl (born 1982), Czech tennis player
 Jean-Pierre Mertl (1930–2012), Luxembourgish association footballer
 Tomáš Mertl (born 1986), Czech ice hockey player

See also
 Mertel

Surnames from given names